Armando Cortesão (31 January 1891 – 29 November 1977) was a Portuguese agronomic engineer, colonial administrator, cartographer, and historian of Portuguese cartography. He also competed in the men's 400 metres and men's 800 metres at the 1912 Summer Olympics.

References

1891 births
1977 deaths
Athletes (track and field) at the 1912 Summer Olympics
Portuguese male sprinters
Olympic athletes of Portugal
Place of birth missing